Ethmia amasina is a moth in the family Depressariidae. It was described by Staudinger in 1880. It is found in Asia Minor (Amasia), Syria, Iraq (Kurdistan) and Iran.

The forewings are white with three black dots on the wing, two on the fold and one after the cell. There is also a row of eight to eleven marginal points. The hindwings are dull grey.

References

Moths described in 1897
amasina